Below is a list of seaside resorts in the United Kingdom.

Shoreham by Sea

A 

 Aberdyfi
 Abergele
 Abersoch
 Aberystwyth
 Appledore, Torridge, Devon
 Ayr

B 
 Bamburgh
 Bangor, County Down
 Barmouth
 Barry
 Barton-on-Sea
 Beer, Devon
 Benllech
 Bexhill-on-Sea
 Blackpool
 Blakeney
 Bognor Regis
 Borth
 Boscombe
 Bournemouth
 Bridlington
 Brighton
 Brixham
 Broadstairs
 Bude
 Budleigh Salterton
 Burnham-on-Sea
 Burntisland

C 
 Caister-on-Sea
 Camber Sands
 Canvey Island
 Chapel St Leonards
 Clacton-on-Sea
 Clarach Bay
 Cleethorpes
 Clevedon
 Cleveleys
 Clovelly
 Collieston
 Colwyn Bay
 Criccieth
 Cromer
 Cruden Bay
 Cullercoats
 Crimdon

D 
 Dartmouth
 Dawlish
 Dawlish Warren
 Deal, Kent
 Dornoch
 Dunbar
 Dunoon

E 
 Eastbourne
 Ellenabeich
 English Riviera
 Exmouth

F 
 Fairbourne
 Falmouth, Cornwall
 Felixstowe
 Ferryside
 Filey
 Fishguard
 Fleetwood
 Folkestone
 Formby
 Fowey
 Frinton-on-Sea

G 
 Girvan
 Goodrington
 Goring-by-Sea
 Gorleston
 Gourock
 Gower Peninsula
 Grange-over-Sands
 Great Yarmouth

H 
 Harlech
 Hastings
 Helensburgh
 Hemsby
 Herne Bay, Kent
 Hopton-on-Sea
 Hornsea
 Hunstanton
 Hythe, Kent

I 
 Ilfracombe
 Ingoldmells

K 
 Kessingland
 Kilchattan Bay
 Kinghorn

L 
 Largs
 Littlehampton
 Llandanwg
 Llanddona
 Llandudno
 Llanfairfechan
 Llangrannog
 Llansteffan
 Looe
 Lowestoft
 Lydd-on-Sea
 Lyme Regis
 Lympstone
 Lynmouth
 Lytham St Annes

M 
 Mablethorpe
 Marazion
 Margate
 Melcombe Regis
 Milford Haven
 Minehead
 Morecambe
 Mumbles
 Mwnt

N 
 Nairn
 Nefyn
 New Brighton, Merseyside
 New Quay
 Newbiggin-by-the-Sea
 Newcastle, County Down
 Newquay
 North Berwick

O 
 Oban
 Overstrand

P 
 Padstow
 Paignton
 Pembrey
 Penarth
 Pendine
 Penmaenmawr
 Penzance
 Perranporth
 Polzeath
 Poole
 Porthcawl
 Porthgain
 Portishead
 Portobello, Edinburgh
 Portrush
 Prestatyn
 Preston, Devon
 Pwllheli
 Portstewart

R 
 Ramsgate
 Redcar
 Rhos-on-Sea
 Rhyl
 Roker, Sunderland
 Rothesay
 Ryde, Isle of Wight

S 
 St Helens, Isle of Wight
 St Ives, Cornwall
 Salcombe
 Salcombe Regis
 Saltburn-by-the-Sea
 Saltcoats
 Sandbanks
 Sandgate, Kent
 Sandilands
 Sandown, Isle of Wight
 Saundersfoot
 Scarborough
 Seaburn, Sunderland
 Seaford
 Seahouses
 Seaton Carew
 Seaton, Devon
 Severn Beach
 Shanklin, Isle of Wight
 Shell Island
 Sheringham
 Sidmouth
 Silloth
 Skegness
 South Shields
 Southbourne, Dorset
 Southend-on-Sea
 Southport
 Southsea
 Southwold
Stonehaven
 Studland
 The Sunrise Coast
 Sutton-on-Sea
 Swanage
 Swansea

T 
 Teignmouth
 Tenby
 Thorpeness
 Torcross
 Torquay
 Towyn
 Trebarwith Strand
 Trearddur
 Tynemouth
 Tywyn

V 
 Ventnor, Isle of Wight

W 
 Walton-on-the-Naze
 Watchet
 Westcliff-on-Sea
 Westgate-on-Sea
 Weston-super-Mare
 Westward Ho!
 Weymouth
 Whitby
 Whitehaven
 Whitley Bay
 Whitstable
 Widemouth Bay
 Withernsea
 Woolacombe
 Worthing

Y 
 Yarmouth
 Ynyslas

See also 
Tourism in the United Kingdom
Seaside resort
List of places on the British coastline
List of beaches

External links 

Blue Skies Project — mostly in PDF format.  Research and conclusions of North Somerset District council, involving the identity crisis and re-branding of Weston-super-Mare.  Indicative of the need for English resorts to adapt.
UK Coast Guide with details of seaside resorts around the UK
International Association of Top Seaside Resorts

Seaside resorts
 
United Kingdom